The Madison Curling Club (MCC) is a curling club located in McFarland, Wisconsin, United States. MCC was the third-largest curling club in the United States with 570 members as of February 2014.  The club had 590 members for the 2019-2020 season.

History
Planning for the club started in 1919 and then the Madison Curling Club was formally established in 1921. For the club's first eight years games were played under the bleachers at Camp Randall Stadium. In 1930 the club moved to Burr Jones Field in Madison. In 1997 the club moved into their current facility in William McFarland Park in McFarland. The MCC has had at least one member curl for Team USA in every Winter Olympics since curling was instated as a full Olympic sport in 1998.

Leagues
Through the curling season Madison Curling Club members participate in leagues including men's, women's, open (any combination of gender), doubles, and instructional. MCC members are assigned a 1- to 20-point value based on their experience and skill. Many leagues have a point cap not to be exceeded by each team.

National and International Championships
Teams organized out of the Madison Curling Club have won 6 United States Men's Curling Championships and 15 United States Women's Curling Championships.

The Madison Curling Club has hosted the following championship events
1968 US Curling Championship
2001 US Curling Championship
2005 US Curling Championship (served as US Olympic Trials in 2005).
1975 US Junior Championship
1987 US Women's Junior Championship
1994 US Junior Championship
2012 US Junior Championship

Bonspiels
The Madison Curling Club hosts many bonspiels throughout the season as fundraisers or tour sanctioned events:
Halloween Spiel
Curl vs Cancer Bonspiel
Schmecken Spiel!
Madison Cash Spiel
Mixed Doubles Bonspiel
Madison Men's Bonspiel
Madison Mixed Bonspiel
Madison Junior Bonspiel

Affiliations
Wisconsin State Curling Association
United States Curling Association

Notable Members
Craig Brown
4× U.S. National Runner-up: 2001, 2005, 2014, 2015
2× U.S. National Champion: 2000, 2008
U.S. Curling Association Male Athlete of the Year: 2000
Olympian: 2014
Erika Brown
8× U.S. National Champion: 1995, 1996, 1999, 2002, 2004, 2010, 2013, 2015
2× World Championships Runner-up: 1996, 1999
3× Olympian: 1988, 1998, 2014
Steve Brown
Senior World Championships Runner-up: 2004
Senior World Champion: 2002
Coach of U.S. Men's National Champion: 2000
4× Coach of U.S. Women's National Championships Runner-up: 1991, 1994, 2000, 2003
5× Coach of U.S. Women's National Champion: 1992, 1995, 1996, 1999, 2004
U.S. Olympic Committee Curling Coach of the Year: 1996
2× USA Curling Coach of the Year: 1996, 2012; 
USA Curling Hall of Fame Member: 1998 
Mike Fraboni
2× U.S. National Champion: 1991, 2002 
George Godfrey
5× U.S. National Runner-up: 1980, 1985, 1987, 1989, 1992
3× U.S. National Champion: 1982, 1986, 1991
Senior World Championships Runner-up: 2004
Senior World Champion: 2002
Becca Hamilton
Women's Team Olympian: 2018
Mixed Doubles Olympian: 2018
U.S. Curling Association Female Athlete of the Year: 2017
U.S. National Champion: 2014
2× U.S. Junior Champion: 2008, 2011

Matt Hamilton
Men's Team Olympic Gold Medalist: 2018
Mixed Doubles Olympian: 2018
U.S. Curling Association Male Athlete of the Year: 2017
World Men's Championship Bronze Medalist: 2016
U.S. National Champion: 2015
U.S. National Runner-up: 2014
2× U.S. Junior Champion: 2008, 2009
World Junior Champion: 2008
Nicole Joraanstad
2× U.S. Junior Champion: 2000, 2001
2× U.S. Junior Championships Runner-up: 1997, 1999
6× U.S. National Champion: 2002, 2004, 2006, 2007, 2008, 2009 
World Championships Runner-up: 2006
 Olympian: 2010
Richard Maskel
5× U.S. National Runner-up: 1987, 1990, 1992, 1995, 1997
3× U.S. National Champion: 1986, 2002, 2003
Debbie McCormick
4× U.S. Junior Champion: 1991, 1992, 1993, 1994
2× World Junior Runner-up: 1992, 1994
6× U.S. National Champion: 1996, 2001, 2003, 2006, 2007, 2008
3× U.S. National Runner-up: 2002, 2004, 2005
World Champion: 2003
2× World Championships Runner-up: 1996, 2006
4× Olympian: 1998, 2002, 2010, 2014
Nina (Spatola) Roth
Olympian: 2018
2× U.S. National Champion: 2010, 2014
Lori Mountford
2× Olympian: 1988, 1998
2× World Championships Runner-up: 1992, 1996
3× U.S. National Champion: 1992, 1995, 1996

References

External links
Home Page

1921 establishments in Wisconsin
Curling clubs in the United States
Sports in Madison, Wisconsin
Curling in Wisconsin
Sports clubs established in 1921